Federal Route 1409, or Jalan FELDA Waha, is a Federal Land Development Authority (FELDA) federal road in Johor, Malaysia.

Kilometre Zero is located at the Jalan Sedili (Federal Route 99) junction.

List of junctions

Malaysian Federal Roads